The Riverside School District is a small, suburban public school district in Lackawanna County which formed in 1961. The school serves the boroughs of Moosic and Taylor, both suburbs of Scranton. Riverside School District encompasses approximately  square miles. According to 2000 local census data, the district serves a resident population of 12,050. By 2010, the district's population declined to 11,978 people. The educational attainment levels for the school district population (25 years old and over) were 87% high school graduates and 21.7% college graduates.

According to the Pennsylvania Budget and Policy Center, 35.8% of the district's pupils lived at 185% or below the Federal Poverty level as shown by their eligibility for the federal free or reduced price school meal programs in 2012. In 2009, the district residents' per capita income was $18,780, while the median family income was $45,411. In the Commonwealth, the median family income was $49,501 and the United States median family income was $49,445, in 2010. In Lackawanna County, the median household income was $43,673. By 2013, the median household income in the United States rose to $52,100.

The Riverside School District operates two elementary schools: Riverside Elementary West School (kindergarten to fourth grades), and Riverside Elementary East School (kindergarten to sixth grade) and Riverside Junior-Senior High School provides grades 7–12. High school students may choose to attend Career Technology Center of Lackawanna County for training in the construction and mechanical trades. The Northeastern Educational Intermediate Unit IU19 provides the district with a wide variety of services like specialized education for disabled students and hearing, speech and visual disability services and professional development for staff and faculty.

Extracurriculars
The Riverside School District offers a variety of clubs, activities and sports.

Sports
The district funds:

Varsity

Boys
Baseball - AA
B=asketball- AA
Cross country - A
Football - A
Soccer - A
Tennis - AA
Track and field - AA

Girls
Basketball - AA
Cross country - A
Softball - AA
Tennis - AA
Track and field - AA

Junior high school sports

Boys
Baseball
Basketball
Cross country
Football
Soccer
Track and field

Girls
Basketball
Cross country
Softball
Track and field

According to PIAA directory July 2014

Clubs and activities
Riverside School District offers over twenty clubs to the student population.

Art Club
Astronomy Club
Audio/Visual Club
Book Club
Drama Club
FBLA
German Club
Hispanic Club
Math Club
National Honor Society
Newspaper
SADD
Science Club
Snowboard/Ski Club
Student Council
Valhalla Gazette
Vikings Read!Club
Vikings Reading Team
Yearbook

Chorus
Concert Band
Gifted Program
Jazz Band
Marching Band
Marching Units
Scholastic Bowl Team
Reading Competitions
SADD
Student Council

References

School districts in Lackawanna County, Pennsylvania
School districts established in 1961